Karimova is the feminine form of the surname Karimov. Notable people with the surname include:

 Aliya Karimova (born 1978) is a Kazakhstani synchronized swimmer
 Elvina Karimova, Russian female water polo player
 Evgeniya Karimova (born 1989), Uzbekistani taekwondo practitioner
 Flora Karimova (born 1941), Azerbaijani pop music singer, civil rights activist
 Gulnara Karimova (born 1972), the elder daughter of Islam Karimov, the leader of Uzbekistan from 1989 to his death in 2016. Karimova is the founder of the Forum of Culture and Arts of Uzbekistan Foundation and chair of its Board of Trustees; she is also the head of a number of non-governmental organizations (NGOs) focused on cultural and social aspects of life in Uzbekistan
 Gulouchen Karimova (born 1979), Azerbaijani female volleyball player
 Lola Karimova-Tillyaeva (born 1978), Uzbek diplomat and philanthropist
 Natalya Karimova (born 1974), Russian cyclist
 Samara Karimova (born 1991), Kyrgyz pop singer
 Tatyana Karimova, First Lady of Uzbekistan from 1991 until 2016. The widow of former President Islam Karimov
 Yulia Karimova (born 1994), Russian sport shooter

See also
Karimov
Kerimov / Kerimova

Bashkir-language surnames
Kazakh-language surnames
Tajik-language surnames
Tatar-language surnames
Uzbek-language surnames
Surnames of Uzbekistani origin